Rice Station is an ghost town in Estill County, in the U.S. state of Kentucky.

History
A post office called Rice Station was established in 1891, and remained in operation until 1974. The railroad town was named for Charlie Rice, the original owner of the town site.

References

Geography of Estill County, Kentucky
Ghost towns in Kentucky